Patapoklosi is a village in Baranya county, Hungary.

Demographics
In 2001, the population of Baranya county numbered 407,448 inhabitants, including:
 Hungarians = 375,611 (92.19%)
 Germans = 22,720 (5.58%)
 Romani = 10,623 (2.61%)
 Croats = 7,294 (1.79%)
 others.

References

Populated places in Baranya County